The K-Verband (in English "small battle unit", derived from Kleinkampfverbände der Kriegsmarine "small battle units") was a World War II German naval unit that operated a mixture of midget submarines and explosive speed boats. It was formed in April 1944 and operated until 26 April 1945.

The miniature submarines were a mix of one and two-man craft. The Linsen explosive motorboats were operated in units of three with two boats carrying 660-800 lb of explosives and a third tasked with remotely controlling them during their final attack run.

References
Notes

Bibliography

External links
 Pickles, Graham, The K-Verband, The Hemlington Nautical History Society 
 
 

Midget submarines
Military units and formations of the Kriegsmarine
Military units and formations established in 1944
Military units and formations disestablished in 1945